Reza Shanbih (Arabic:رضا شنبيه) (born 4 May 1984) is a Qatari footballer.

External links
 

Qatari footballers
1984 births
Living people
Al-Khor SC players
Al-Shahania SC players
Qatari people of Iranian descent
Qatar Stars League players
Qatari Second Division players
Association football fullbacks
Association football midfielders